Luc Beausoleil (born October 8, 1967) is a Canadian former professional ice hockey player.

Junior career
Beausoleil played junior hockey in the Quebec Major Junior Hockey League (QMJHL) with the Laval Voisins and Laval Titan. He was awarded the 1986–87 Frank J. Selke Memorial Trophy as the QMJHL's Most Sportsmanlike Player and was named to the 1986–87 Second All-Star Team.

Professional career
Beausoleil began his professional career in 1988 with the Murrayfield Racers of the British Hockey League (BHL). He also played in the BHL with the Fife Flyers and Swindon Wildcats, and in France, before returning to North America in 1992 to join the Tulsa Oilers of the new Central Hockey League (CHL). He went on to play seven seasons with Tulsa, playing 363 regular season games and 39 playoff games for the Oilers between 1992 and 2000. He led the Oilers to capture the inaugural 1992–93 Ray Miron President's Cup as the champion of the CHL, and during the 1997–98 CHL season he established the CHL record of 30 power play goals in a single season, and scored 127 points in 68 games played to win the Joe Burton Award as the CHL's top scorer. During the 1999-2000 season, he was named to the CHL All-Star Team's starting lineup. In 2003, the Oilers retired Beuasoleil's #17 in a ceremony before a game on February 19. At the time, he was the team's all-time leading scorer and ranked third in league history in total goals scored.

Roller hockey
In 1997 Beausoleil played 20 games with the Ottawa Wheels in the Roller Hockey International league.

Awards and honours

References

External links

1967 births
Living people
Canadian ice hockey right wingers
Fife Flyers players
Laval Titan players
Laval Voisins players
Murrayfield Racers players
Ottawa Wheels players
Reno Renegades players
San Antonio Dragons players
Ice hockey people from Montreal
Swindon Wildcats players
Tulsa Oilers (1992–present) players
Tupelo T-Rex players
Canadian expatriate ice hockey players in England
Canadian expatriate ice hockey players in Scotland
Canadian expatriate ice hockey players in the United States
Canadian expatriate ice hockey players in Italy